Greenlawn Cemetery may refer to:

Green Lawn Cemetery (Columbus, Ohio)
Greenlawn Cemetery (Nahant, Massachusetts)
Green Lawn Cemetery, (China Grove, North Carolina)
Greenlawn Memorial Park (Newport News, Virginia)
Greenlawn Cemetery (Indianapolis, Indiana)
Greenlawn Cemetery (Portsmouth, Ohio)